Toroa is a 1989 sculpture by New Zealand artist Peter Nicholls. It is located on the foreshore of Otago Harbour in the city of Dunedin, New Zealand. It is part of the collection of Dunedin Public Art Gallery.

The work stands  in height, and is created from large cuts of wood arrayed so as to represent the wings of an albatross (toroa is the Māori word for albatross). Dunedin's Otago Peninsula, visible from the sculpture's site, is the location of the only breeding colony of royal albatross on an inhabited mainland. Academic Peter Leech has commented that Toroa captures "the paradox of flight in that winged ponderousness and spine muscularity of the bird heaving its half ton-ness off the ground in a ruffle of massive feathers."

Toroa was originally created from macrocarpa timber, which was prone to weathering, and was reconstructed in South American purpleheart hardwood in 2020.

References

Buildings and structures in Dunedin
Outdoor sculptures in New Zealand
1989 sculptures
Culture in Dunedin
Tourist attractions in Dunedin
Animal sculptures in New Zealand